Zhang Wen may refer to:

Zhang Wen (Han dynasty) (張溫, died 191), courtesy name Boshen (伯慎), Eastern Han dynasty politician
Zhang Wen (Eastern Wu) (張溫, 193–230), courtesy name Huishu (惠恕), Eastern Wu politician in the Three Kingdoms period, see Records of the Three Kingdoms
Zhang Wen (badminton) (张稳, born 1992), Chinese badminton player

See also
Wen Zhang (born 1984), Chinese actor